Time in Tajikistan is given by Tajikistan Time (TJT) (UTC+05:00). Tajikistan does not currently observe daylight saving time. The IANA identifier for Tajikistan Time is Asia/Dushanbe.

IANA time zone database
Data for Tajikistan directly from zone.tab of the IANA time zone database. Columns marked with * are the columns from zone.tab itself.

History
Historic time zones for Tajikistan (both as an independent country and a Soviet state)

References

Tajikistan